Rodolfo Jiménez (born 15 August 1972) is a Mexican film and television actor. He is also a television host.

Early life
Jiménez was born Rodolfo Jiménez Munoz in Guadalajara, Jalisco, Mexico.

Film and television work

References

External links
Rodolfojimenez.com, Jiménez official website

 
 
 
 

1972 births
Living people
Mexican male film actors
Mexican male television actors
Mexican television presenters
Male actors from Guadalajara, Jalisco